Muslim Massacre may refer to:

Muslim Massacre (video game), a controversial 2008 amateur computer game
The various Moro massacres during the dictatorship of former Philippine President Ferdinand Marcos
Any massacre of or by Muslims; see List of events named massacres